Kim Jong-hoon (Hangul: 김종훈 Hanja: 金宗壎, born 5 May 1952) is Director of the Ministry of Foreign Affairs and Trade (South Korea). He has played a major role in the South Korea–United States Free Trade Agreement.

References

1952 births
Living people
Yonsei University alumni
Members of the National Assembly (South Korea)
South Korean Buddhists